I nuovi mostri (English-language version: Viva l'Italia!; meaning of Italian original title: "The new monsters") is a 1977 commedia all'italiana film composed by 14 episodes, directed by Dino Risi, Ettore Scola and Mario Monicelli. It is a sequel of I mostri, made in 1963. It was nominated for the Academy Award for Best Foreign Language Film at the 51st Academy Awards.

Episodes 
The original version is composed by 14 episodes.

Plot 
The film, like the previous one, consists of short episodes that portray the evil and meanness of Italian middle-class society during the years of lead in the 70s.

Editions 
The full version of the film runs about 115 minutes, but upon its release in Italy, the film was censored a few episodes considered too "strong". The length of the cut version of the film lasts about 87 minutes.

See also
 List of submissions to the 51st Academy Awards for Best Foreign Language Film
 List of Italian submissions for the Academy Award for Best Foreign Language Film

References

External links
 

1977 films
1977 comedy films
1970s Italian-language films
Commedia all'italiana
Italian anthology films
Films set in Rome
Films set in Sicily
Films set in Emilia-Romagna
Films shot in Rome
Films directed by Mario Monicelli
Films directed by Ettore Scola
Films directed by Dino Risi
Films with screenplays by Ruggero Maccari
Films scored by Armando Trovajoli
1970s Italian films